The 1937 Connecticut State Huskies football team represented Connecticut State College, now the University of Connecticut, in the 1937 college football season.  The Huskies were led by fourth-year head coach J. Orlean Christian and completed the season with a record of 6–2–1.

Schedule

References

Connecticut State
UConn Huskies football seasons
Connecticut State Huskies football